A muzzle brake or recoil compensator is a device connected to, or a feature integral to the construction of, the muzzle or barrel of a firearm or cannon that is intended to redirect a portion of propellant gases to counter recoil and unwanted muzzle rise. Barrels with an integral muzzle brake are often said to be ported. 

The concept of a muzzle brake was first introduced for artillery. It was a common feature on many anti-tank guns, especially those mounted on tanks, in order to reduce the area needed to take up the strokes of recoil and kickback. They have been used in various forms for rifles and pistols to help control recoil and the rising of the barrel that normally occurs after firing. They are used on pistols for practical pistol competitions, and are usually called compensators in this context.

Rationale 

The interchangeable terms muzzle rise, muzzle flip, or muzzle climb refer to the tendency of a handheld firearm's front end (the muzzle end of the barrel) to rise after firing. Firearms with less height from the grip line to the barrel centerline tend to experience less muzzle rise.

The muzzle rises primarily because, for most firearms, the centerline of the barrel is above the center of contact between the shooter and the firearm's grip and stock. The reactive forces from the fired bullet and propellant gases exiting the muzzle act directly down the centerline of the barrel. If that line of force is above the center of the contact points, this creates a moment or torque (rotational force) that causes the firearm to rotate and the muzzle to rise. The M1946 Sieg automatic rifle had an unusual muzzle brake that made the rifle climb downward, but enabled the user to fire it with one hand in full automatic.

Design and construction 

Muzzle brakes are simple in concept, such as the one employed on the 90 mm M3 gun used on the M47 Patton tank. This consists of a small length of tubing (mounted at right angles) at the end of the barrel. Brakes most often utilize slots, vents, holes, baffles, and similar devices. The strategy of a muzzle brake is to redirect and control the burst of combustion gases following the departure of a projectile.

All muzzle brake designs share a basic principle: to partially divert combustion gases from the muzzle end of the bore at a (generally) perpendicular angle to the long axis of the barrel. The momentum of the diverted gases thus does not add to the recoil. The angle toward which the gases are directed will fundamentally affect how the brake behaves. If gases are directed upward, they will exert a downward force and counteract muzzle rise.  Any device that is attached to the end of the muzzle will also add mass, increasing its inertia and moving its center of mass forward; the former will reduce recoil and the latter will reduce muzzle rise.

Construction of a muzzle brake or compensator can be as simple as a diagonal cut at the muzzle end of the barrel to direct some of the escaping gas upward. On the AKM assault rifle, the brake also angles slightly to the right to counteract the sideways movement of the rifle under recoil.

Another simple method is porting, where holes or slots are machined into the barrel near the muzzle to allow the gas to escape.

More advanced designs use baffles and expansion chambers to slow escaping gases. This is the basic principle behind a linear compensator. Ports are often added to the expansion chambers, producing the long, multi-chambered recoil compensators often seen on IPSC raceguns.

Venting direction 

Most linear compensators redirect the gases forward. Since that is where the bullet is going, they typically work by allowing the gases to expand into the compensator, which surrounds the muzzle but only has holes facing forward; like any device which allows the gases to expand before leaving the firearm, they are effectively a type of muzzle shroud. They reduce muzzle rise similarly to the mechanism by which a sideways brake does: since all the gas is escaping in the same direction, any muzzle rise would need to alter the velocity of the gas, which costs kinetic energy. When the brake redirects the gases directly backward, instead, the effect is similar to the reverse thrust system on an aircraft jet engine: any blast energy coming back at the shooter is pushing "against" the recoil, effectively reducing the actual amount of recoil on the shooter. Of course, this also means the gases are directed toward the shooter.

When the gases are primarily directed upward, the braking is referred to as porting. Porting typically involves precision-drilled ports or holes in the forward top part of the barrel and slide on pistols. These holes divert a portion of the gases expelled prior to the departure of the projectile in a direction that reduces the tendency of the firearm to rise. The concept is an application of Newton's third law; the exhaust directed upward causes a reciprocal force downward. This is why firearms are never ported on the bottom of the barrel, as that would exacerbate muzzle rise, rather than mitigate it. Porting has the undesired consequences of shortening the effective barrel length and reducing muzzle velocity, while a muzzle brake is an extension added to the barrel and does not reduce muzzle velocity. Porting has the advantage for faster follow-up shots, especially for 3-round burst operation.

Effectiveness 

Although there are numerous ways to measure the energy of a recoil impulse, in general, a 10% to 50% reduction can be measured. Some muzzle brake manufacturers claim greater recoil reduction percentages. Muzzle brakes need sufficient propellant gas volume and high gas pressure at the muzzle of the firearm to achieve well-measured recoil reduction percentages. This means cartridges with a small bore area to case volume ratio (overbore cartridges) combined with a high operating pressure benefit more from recoil reduction with muzzle brakes than smaller standard cartridges.

Besides reducing felt recoil, one of the primary advantages of a muzzle brake is the reduction of muzzle rise. This lets a shooter realign a weapon's sights more quickly. This is relevant for fully automatic weapons. Muzzle rise can theoretically be eliminated by an efficient design. Because the rifle moves rearward less, the shooter has little to compensate for. Muzzle brakes benefit rapid-fire, fully automatic fire, and large-bore hunting rifles. They are also common on small-bore vermin rifles, where reducing the muzzle rise lets the shooter see the bullet impact through a telescopic sight. A reduction in recoil also reduces the chance of undesired (painful) contacts between the shooter's head and the ocular of a telescopic sight or other aiming components that must be positioned near the shooter's eye (often referred to as "scope eye"). Another advantage of a muzzle brake is a reduction of recoil fatigue during extended practice sessions, enabling the shooter to consecutively fire more rounds accurately. Further, flinch (involuntary pre-trigger-release anxiety behavior resulting in inaccurate aiming and shooting) caused by excessive recoil may be reduced or eliminated.

Disadvantages 

There are a number of potential downsides to brakes and compensators.

The shooter, gun crew, or close bystanders may perceive an increase in sound pressure level as well as an increase in muzzle blast and lead exposure. This occurs because the sound, flash, pressure waves, and lead loaded smoke plume normally projected away from the shooter are now partially redirected outward to the side or sometimes at partially backward angles toward the shooter or gun crew. Standard eye and ear protection, important for all shooters, may not be adequate to avoid hearing damage with the muzzle blast partially vectored back toward the gun crew or spotters by arrowhead shaped reactive muzzle brakes found on sniper teams firing anti-materiel rifles like the Barrett M82.

Measurements indicate that on a rifle, a muzzle brake adds 5 to 10 dB to the normal noise level perceived by the shooter, increasing total noise levels up to 160 dB(A) ± 3 dB.  Painful discomfort occurs at approximately 120 to 125 dB(A), with some references claiming 133 dB(A) for the threshold of pain.

Brakes and compensators also add length, diameter, and mass to the muzzle end of a firearm, where it most influences its handling and may interfere with accuracy as muzzle rise will occur when the brake is removed and shooting without the brake can throw off the strike of the round.

Another problem can occur when saboted ammunition is used as the sabot tends to break up inside the brake. The problem is particularly pronounced when armour-piercing fin-stabilized discarding-sabot (APFSDS), a type of long-rod penetrator (LRP) (or kinetic energy penetrator), are used. Since these APFSDS rounds are the most common armour-piercing ammunition currently, virtually no modern main battle tank guns have muzzle brakes.

A serious tactical disadvantage of muzzle brakes on both small arms and artillery is that, depending on their designs, they may cause escaping gases to throw up dust and debris clouds that impair visibility and reveal one's position, not to mention posing a hazard to individuals without eye protection. Troops often wet the ground in front of antitank guns in defensive emplacements to prevent this, and snipers are specially trained in techniques for suppressing or concealing the magnified effects of lateral muzzle blast when firing rifles with such brakes. Linear compensators and suppressors do not have the disadvantages of a redirected muzzle blast; they actually reduce the blast by venting high pressure gas forward at reduced velocity.

The redirection of larger amounts of escaping high-pressure gas can cause discomfort caused by blast-induced sinus cavity concussion. Such discomfort can especially become a problem for anti-materiel rifle shooters due to the bigger than normal cartridges with accompanying large case capacities and propellant volumes these rifles use and can be a reason for promoting accelerated shooter fatigue and flinching. Furthermore, the redirected blast may direct pressure waves toward the eye, potentially leading to retinal detachment when repeated shooting is performed with anti-materiel and large caliber weapons.

Examples

US legislation and regulation 
The State of California outlaws flash suppressors on semiautomatic rifles with detachable magazines, but allows muzzle brakes to be used instead.

The Bureau of Alcohol, Tobacco, Firearms, and Explosives (ATF) made a regulatory determination in 2013 that the muzzle device of the SIG Sauer MPX Carbine, adapted from the baffle core of the integrally suppressed version's suppressor and claimed by SIG to be a muzzle brake, constituted a silencer and rendered the MPX-C a Title II NFA weapon. SIG Sauer, the rifle's maker, sued the ATF in 2014 to have the designation overturned. In September 2015, Federal Judge Paul Barbadora upheld the ATF's ruling; despite SIG successfully establishing that the muzzle device did not suppress the weapon's sound, the ATF successfully established that it was intended to suppress the sound, which was legally sufficient.

See also 
 Flash suppressor
 Muzzle booster
 Muzzle shroud
 Silencer (firearms)

References

External links 

 High speed photography on muzzle brakes
 Chuck Hawks' article on muzzle brakes
 Pictures of various muzzle brake types
 Adventures with muzzle brakes
 Glock's page on Compensated Pistols

Firearm muzzle devices
Artillery components
Tank subassembly